Damned Damned Damned is the debut studio album by English punk rock band the Damned. It was released on 18 February 1977 by Stiff Records. Produced by Nick Lowe, Damned Damned Damned was the first full-length album released by a UK punk group.

Background and production 
After the success of "New Rose" and a tour with the Sex Pistols, the Heartbreakers and the Clash, the band went into Pathway Studios to record the album Damned Damned Damned with producer Nick Lowe, who had previously recorded "New Rose" with them. Following 10 days of recording, the mix was completed on 15 January 1977, the day the master tapes were compiled.

Album cover 
The album cover features the four members of the band after they were hit by pies. Guitarist Brian James recalled: "That was organised by this photographer called Peter Kodick, Stiff Records had assigned him to do the thing. They thought it was a jolly wheeze to surprise us with a few cream cakes, little knowing that we would relish it, get into to it and enjoy the whole experience". After the photo session, Damned bassist Captain Sensible noted: "... I had more pie on my face than any of the other buggers and on the back of the sleeve I had my back to the picture, so I went down a photo booth and got some pictures, cut one out and said 'put that on there' so I would have something to show my relatives, because I didn't think we'd be invited to make another album". Stiff, however, used a different photo than the one Sensible gave to the label.

Stiff deliberately printed a limited number of initial copies of the LP with a photo of Eddie and the Hot Rods on the back of the album cover, rather than the Damned playing at The Roxy. An "erratum" sticker was also put on the back cover, and on the front of the LP - on top of the original shrink wrap - was a red "food-fight" sticker that said "Damned Damned", thus completing the LP title when read underneath the band's name. Stiff was known for such unusual promotional activity. As of 2020, a copy of this rare print which still had both stickers and the shrink wrap intact (slit-open or sealed) fetched £650-1500, depending on condition.

The album design was credited to Big Jobs Inc, a pseudonym of Barney Bubbles.

Release and reception

Damned Damned Damned was issued by Stiff Records on 18 February 1977, which was also James' 22nd birthday.

In a contemporary review for NME, Chris Welch praised the Damned's musical ability, opining that the band have "all the residual skills needed for the actual performance of exhausting modern music". Welch remarked that James was the most effective powerhouse guitarist since Pete Townshend and concluded that the album as a whole was "a highly professional production and is much more convincing than some other new wave bands I've heard on record."

In a 1980 Trouser Press review of Machine Gun Etiquette, Ira Robbins described Damned Damned Damned as "instant obsolescence despite near-perfection".

BBC Music's retrospective review praised the album's energy, pop satire and general humour, with reviewer Chris Jones commenting, "Each track featured the hammering toms of Rat Scabies and Captain Sensible's bass-as-guitar propelling Brian James' exhilarating machine gun axe into your living room".

The American press has also favored the album. Ned Raggett of AllMusic called it "a stone classic of rock & roll fire" and declared that "Damned Damned Damned is and remains rock at its messy, wonderful best." In a review of the Damned's 2001 album Grave Disorder, Pitchfork critic Joe Tangari cited Damned Damned Damned and 1979's Machine Gun Etiquette as the only two Damned albums that he found "very good".

Track listing

30th Anniversary Expanded Edition 
Adapted from the album's liner notes.

The first disc contains the twelve tracks from the original album.

Note

Disc 3 was recorded at the Damned's live debut at the 100 Club on 6 July 1976 supporting the Sex Pistols. Recorded on a Sony cassette recorder, hidden in a sports bag, onto a Scotch 120 tape.

Personnel

The Damned 
 Dave Vanian – vocals
 Brian James – guitar, vocals
 Captain Sensible – bass, vocals
 Rat Scabies – drums, vocals

Production 
 Nick Lowe – producer
 Barry "Bazza" Farmer – engineer
 Peter "Kodick" Gravelle – cover photography

Charts

Release history

References

External links 

 

The Damned (band) albums
1977 debut albums
Frontier Records albums
Sanctuary Records albums
Stiff Records albums
Albums produced by Nick Lowe